Alastor (Alastor) aeger is a species of wasp in the family Vespidae.

Distribution

Alastor aeger is known from southern Africa, and is recorded from Namibia, Zimbabwe, South Africa, and Mozambique (Rikatla, Delagoa).

References

aeger